Mankapur Junction railway station is located in Mankapur town of Gonda district, Uttar Pradesh. It serves Mankapur town. Its code is MUR. It has five platforms. Kushinagar Exp, Rapti Sagar Sperfast Express, Intercity, Prayagraj Sangam, Durg Express, Saryu Express, Varanasi Baharaich Intercity, Awadh Express, Chhapra Kachehri Gomti Nagar, Satyagrah Express and many more trains halt here.

References 

Lucknow NER railway division
Railway junction stations in Uttar Pradesh